Pedicularis oederi is a species of flowering plant belonging to the family Orobanchaceae.

Its native range is Subarctic and Subalpine Northern Hemisphere.

References

oederi